A headache is an unpleasant sensation in the head.

Headache may also refer to:
Headache (game), a board game
Headache (EP), an extended-play music recording by Big Black
Headache, a single album by Moon Jong-up
Headache (journal), a medical journal
"Headache" (song), a 1994 song by Frank Black
Headache, the solo project of former Lower Than Atlantis frontman Mike Duce.
"Headache" (Grimm), a 2015 episode of the television series Grimm